The 2nd Independent Division of Guangxi Military District() was formed in August 1966 from Public Security Contingent of Guangxi Zhuang Autonomous Region. The division stationed in Nanning Guangxi.

In July-August 1968, the division, along with other units of Guangxi Military District, conducted military operation against Red Guards Faction "April Twenty-Second"(abbreviation of "Guangxi April 22nd Revolutionary Movement Command") in Nanning, Guangxi, during which the military forces killed 1470 and "captured" over 8500 civilians.

In March 1969, the division moved to Hepu, Guangxi, leaving its 6th Regiment in Nanning (later detached and moved to Chongzuo in April). In Hepu the division absorbed former 112th Garrison Regiment (then became its new 6th Regiment).

From March to December 1969 the division was temporarily renamed as Independent Division of Hepu(). From December 1969 the division was renamed as 2nd Independent Division of Guangxi Military District again.

In January 1976 the division was renamed as Independent Division of Guangxi Military District() following the disbandment of 1st Independent Division of Guangxi Military District. The division was then composed of three infantry regiments (1st to 3rd) and an artillery regiment.

In February 1979 the division took part in the Sino-Vietnamese War. During the war the division suffered heavy casualties.

In April 1979 the division was renamed as 1st Border Defense Division of Guangxi Military District(). All its regiments were converted to border defense regiments.

In 1985 the division was re-organized and renamed as 1st Garrison Division of Guangzhou Military Region().

The division was disbanded in December 1992.

References
中国各省军区独立师的历史沿革, https://web.archive.org/web/20160918225002/http://www.360doc.com/content/13/1205/20/1164894_334784330.shtml
中国人民解放军各步兵师沿革，http://blog.sina.com.cn/s/blog_a3f74a990101cp1q.html

Garrison Guangzhou
Military units and formations disestablished in 1992
Military units and formations established in 1966